The COTA Bank is a commercial bank headquartered in Central District, Taichung, Taiwan. By 2017, the bank had 30 branches in Taiwan, employed 1,100 people, and had NT$6.3 billion under management. 16 of the branches are in Taichung, while the rest are in Taipei, Xinzhuang, Banqiao, and Nanbu.

The bank was founded in 1915 as a private limited company named Taichung Credit Union. It primary clientele then was Japanese people living in Taiwan. In 1999, the credit union was reorganized into a commercial bank.

COTA Bank frequently received media attention for its management rights disputes and mergers and acquisitions. Analysts said that COTA Bank experienced management rights disputes in 2017 two times within three years for several reasons. Although its scope is not large, it over the years accumulated "a stable source of customers" in Taichung, Kaohsiung, Taipei, and other areas which gave it a stable profit, analysts said. The barriers to entry to COTA Bank are low owing to its small share capital.

See also
List of banks in Taiwan

References

External links
 Official website

1915 establishments in Taiwan
Banks of Taiwan
Banks established in 1915
Companies based in Taichung